Ocean City Municipal Airport may refer to:

 Ocean City Municipal Airport (Maryland) in Ocean City, Maryland, United States
 Ocean City Municipal Airport (New Jersey) in Ocean City, New Jersey, United States